Na Brańskiej  is a settlement in the administrative district of Gmina Bielsk Podlaski within Bielsk County, Podlaskie Voivodeship in north-eastern Poland.

References

Villages in Bielsk County